Apollo 13 was a 1970 lunar mission in NASA's Apollo program.

Apollo 13 may also refer to:
 Apollo 13 (film), a 1995 film
 Apollo 13 (pinball), a pinball game
 Apollo 13: Mission Control, an interactive theater show
 Lost Moon or Apollo 13, a book by Jim Lovell